The Sociedad General de Escritores de México (SOGEM) (English: General Society of Writers of Mexico) is an association of Mexican writers founded in 1976 with its headquarters in Mexico City, Mexico. It is in charge of protecting the copyright of its members, in addition to promoting and disseminating literary production. It is part of the International Confederation of Societies of Authors and Composers, an organization that brings together the different societies of authors around the world. It contains Mexico's oldest school of creative writing called Escuela de Escritores which its graduates have achieved more than 250 literary awards. Recognized Mexican writers such as Alberto Chimal, Vicente Leñero, Emilio Carballido, and Gonzalo Soltero, among others, have taught in their classrooms.

External links
Sociedad General de Escritores de México Official (In Spanish).
Sociedad General de Escritores de México (SOGEM) (In Spanish).
La Sogem busca recuperar su época dorada (In Spanish).
Inauguran las nuevas instalaciones de la Sogem (In Spanish).
EL PRIVILEGIO DE OPINAR - Piedad para los escritores (In Spanish).

Mexico